The 2021 Supercoppa Italiana (branded as the Supercoppa Frecciarossa for sponsorship reasons) was the 34th edition of the Supercoppa Italiana, the Italian football super cup. It was played between Internazionale, winners of the 2020–21 Serie A championship, and Juventus, winners of the 2020–21 Coppa Italia. On 11 November 2021, it was announced that the match would be played on 12 January 2022 at San Siro, Milan.

Internazionale won the match 2–1 after extra time for their sixth Supercoppa Italiana title.

Background
This was the second Derby d'Italia in the Supercoppa Italiana, as the two teams had already met in the 2005 edition where Internazionale won 1–0 after extra time. Internazionale made their tenth Supercoppa Italiana appearance, and first since 2011 when they lost to city rivals AC Milan. Before the match, they had a 5–4 record in the Supercoppa Italiana. Juventus made their tenth consecutive appearance, and 17th overall. They had a 5–4 Supercoppa Italiana record during this run, and were 9–7 overall.

Match

Details

See also
 2020–21 Serie A
 2020–21 Coppa Italia

Notes

References

2021
Inter Milan matches
Juventus F.C. matches
2021–22 in Italian football cups
January 2022 sports events in Italy